Aliabad-e Posht-e Rig (also Romanized as ‘Alīābād-e Posht-e Rīg and ‘Alīābād-e Posht Rīg; also known as ‘Alīābād and ‘Alīābād Yasht Rīg) is a village in Rigan Rural District, in the Central District of Rigan County, Kerman Province, Iran. At the 2006 census, its population was 765, in 201 families.

References 

Populated places in Rigan County